Abdulrahman Al-Dhefiri (Arabic:عبد الرحمن الظفيري, born 20 May 1999) is a Saudi football player. He currently plays for Al-Orobah as a midfielder.

Honours
Al-Hazem
MS League: 2020–21

External links

References

1999 births
Living people
Saudi Arabian footballers
Saudi Arabian expatriate footballers
Kuwait SC players
Al Nassr FC players
Al Batin FC players
Al-Ain FC (Saudi Arabia) players
Khaleej FC players
Al-Hazem F.C. players
Al-Orobah FC players
Association football midfielders
Saudi Professional League players
Saudi First Division League players
Saudi Arabian expatriate sportspeople in Kuwait